Karlabko is a rural locality (a selo) and the administrative centre of Karlabkinsky Selsoviet, Levashinsky District, Republic of Dagestan, Russia. The population was 2,684 as of 2010. There are 26 streets.

Geography 
Karlabko is located 16 km southeast of Levashi (the district's administrative centre) by road, on the Khalagork River. Suleybakent and Nizhniye Labkomakhi are the nearest rural localities.

Nationalities 
Dargins live there.

References 

Rural localities in Levashinsky District